John Francis "Frank" Cashen (September 13, 1925 – June 30, 2014) was a Major League Baseball general manager. He was an executive when the Baltimore Orioles won the 1966 World Series, and 1970 World Series while winning three consecutive AL pennants from 1969 to 1971. Later he became General Manager of the New York Mets from 1980 to 1991, and the club won the 1986 World Series during his tenure.

Early life
Cashen was born in Baltimore, Maryland in 1925 and grew up admiring and playing baseball. He played second base at Loyola College in Maryland but was unable to hit well and did not pursue a playing career.  Instead, he joined the Baltimore News-American becoming an award-winning sportswriter over 17 years at the newspaper. He spent nights at University of Maryland School of Law, graduating with a JD in 1958. He assumed his career would either be in journalism or law. Instead, he was hired by Jerry Hoffberger to be a publicity director for two Baltimore race tracks and later the advertising head at Hoffberger's National Brewing Company. In 1965, when Hoffberger's brewing company purchased the Baltimore Orioles in full (Hoffberger had been part-owner of the team since their arrival in 1954), Cashen eagerly accepted the position of executive vice president of the team.

Baltimore Orioles
With Cashen overseeing baseball operations in Baltimore, general manager Harry Dalton made a deal to acquire future Hall of Famer Frank Robinson from the Cincinnati Reds, sending pitcher Milt Pappas, pitcher Jack Baldschun and outfielder Dick Simpson. The following year, Robinson won the triple crown and Baltimore won the 1966 World Series for their first championship.  In 1968, the Cashen/Dalton front office hired eventual Hall of Fame manager Earl Weaver.  The Orioles won all three American League pennants from 1969 to 1971 and won the 1970 World Series.  After 1971, Dalton left to become general manager of the Los Angeles Angels and Cashen took over G.M. duties for the Orioles.

Cashen was being mentioned as a candidate for the American League presidency and was a leading choice to replace Baseball Commissioner Bowie Kuhn when a group of team owners tried to oust Kuhn in 1975.  Kuhn survived the storm of 1975.  Also in 1975 Hofferger's National Brewery merged with Carling Brewery (American Operation). Hofferger requested Cashen to leave the Orioles and return to the Carling National Brewery as senior vice president of marketing and sales. In 1979, he returned to baseball when Commissioner Kuhn hired him as The Administrator of Baseball Operations.

New York Mets
In January 1980, Nelson Doubleday Jr. and Fred Wilpon bought the New York Mets after the Mets' third consecutive last-place finish.  They were advised by several people to contact Cashen and, after he predicted four or five years for a turnaround, the new owners hired him for $500,000 over five years.  Cashen hired public relations firm Della Femina Travisano & Partners.  A new slogan, "The Magic Is Back!", was used along with television commercials emphasizing past New York area stars rather than the dismal Mets of the late 1970s.

On the field, the Mets made few trades early on, but took a chance with the first pick in the Major League Baseball Draft to sign a talented, but raw high school player, Darryl Strawberry, who eventually finished his Mets career as the all-time franchise leader in home runs and RBIs.  In 1981, Cashen promoted Hubie Brooks and Mookie Wilson to the majors for spring training and then traded for brash home run hitter Dave Kingman.  In 1982, Cashen delighted New York fans by trading for former unanimous MVP, George Foster, who then signed a five-year, $10 million contract with the club. Two months later, Cashen alienated many fans by trading away fan favorite, Lee Mazzilli, who soon declined while one of the two pitchers the Mets received, Ron Darling, became an All-Star and the other pitcher, Walt Terrell, was later traded for offensive star, Howard Johnson. At the same time as the Mazzilli trade, the Mets were scouting young pitcher, Dwight Gooden, who they picked in the 1982 draft. Gooden would later become the ace of the pitching staff through the Mets' strong years and championship. 

While Foster and Kingman performed below expectations and the Mets finished poorly in both 1982 and 1983, Cashen made one of the most lopsided trades in franchise history, acquiring former MVP, batting champion, and 1982 World Champion member Keith Hernandez from St. Louis for pitchers Neil Allen and Rick Ownbey. Hernandez became a team leader both offensively and defensively while Allen was an average pitcher and Ownbey played in only 21 more games in the majors. 

In 1984, Cashen hired Davey Johnson to be the Mets' manager for a $100,000 annual salary. Johnson had been the second baseman with the Orioles while Cashen was the G.M. After a successful 1984 season which saw the Mets first winning record since 1976, Cashen and the Mets traded Hubie Brooks and three others to the Montreal Expos for future Hall of Fame catcher, Gary Carter, and most of the pieces were in place for a championship team.  The Mets barely missed the playoffs in 1985 and then won the 1986 World Series with the best record of any team during the 1980s.

Decline in New York
While Cashen was largely credited for building the Mets into the 1986 World Champions, he was quickly vilified for dismantling the franchise when a dynasty never materialized.  In various transactions, future MVP Kevin Mitchell, scrappy clubhouse leaders Lenny Dykstra, Roger McDowell, and Wally Backman, as well as fan favorite Mookie Wilson, and future All-Stars Rick Aguilera and Kevin Tapani, were traded away.

In return, the Mets received the hugely disappointing Juan Samuel as well as Frank Viola (who won 20 games in 1990 but was otherwise only average in less than three seasons with New York), Jeff Musselman (who was out of baseball after 1990), and four players who never played in the majors. Hernandez, Carter, and World Series MVP Ray Knight were either released or granted free agency in the years following the championship. Instead, the Mets hopes were pinned on Gregg Jefferies who soon faltered and was very unpopular on the team. After stumbling to a fifth-place finish in 1991, Cashen stepped down as the Mets' general manager - just five years after the franchise won the title.

Later life
Following his tenure as general manager of the Mets, Cashen continued working with the team in various capacities, including chief operating officer in 1992 and consultant in 1993. In November 1998, the Mets general manager, Steve Phillips, took time off to address a sexual harassment lawsuit and Cashen was named interim GM for a week.

Cashen was inducted into the New York Mets Hall of Fame on August 1, 2010 alongside Davey Johnson, Dwight Gooden, and Darryl Strawberry. Cashen died on June 30, 2014 from congestive heart failure at the age of 88. Cashen and his wife Jean had seven children. Cashen was noted for frequently wearing a bow tie.

Record as General Manager

Death
Cashen died on June 30, 2014, at the age of 88, after a short illness.

References

External links
Frank Cashen at SABR (Baseball BioProject)

1925 births
2014 deaths
Sportspeople from Baltimore
Major League Baseball general managers
New York Mets executives
Baltimore Orioles executives
Loyola University Maryland alumni
Major League Baseball executives
American chief operating officers